The Crabb Family is a southern gospel group originally from Beaver Dam, Kentucky. They have had sixteen No. 1 songs on the national radio charts.

Group history
The Crabb Family Members: oldest  Jason, twin brothers Adam and Aaron, and sisters Kelly and Terah.

The group was formed in Beaver Dam, a town in rural Kentucky. The family patriarch, Gerald Crabb, and wife Kathy Crabb, were the founders of the group. Kathy managed the group until their retirement in 2007. Throughout their career, the group has released numerous albums and received several awards.

Although their roots are primarily southern gospel, the Crabb Family's recording, Blur The Lines features a variety of styles of music. The Crabb Family also reached a vast concert audience. Their schedule lead them from the Grand Ole Opry to a contemporary Christian festival in South Dakota and everything in-between the two venues.

Farewell
In August 2006, the Crabb Family, Jason, Adam, Aaron, Terah and Kelly decided to follow individual paths. The siblings felt it was time to move to a new season in their lives. Each member plans to pursue their separate ministries. The Crabb Family has finished their tour to thank their fans for their unwavering support over the past ten years. Their last tour date as a group was August 1, 2007.

After that, Jason Crabb has started his own solo career. His brother Aaron started a duo with his wife Amanda called simply Aaron & Amanda Crabb, while Adam and Terah started a band called Crabb Revival. In 2009, Terah decided to leave the band to become a full-time mother. Kelly Bowling has also joined her husband, Mike, in a musical career as a member of The Bowling Family (formerly The Mike Bowling Group).  In 2011, in addition to performing with his wife, Aaron Crabb became a founding member of the quartet Canton Junction, in which he sings lead.  In 2014, Adam Crabb  joined the Gaither Vocal Band.

The Crabb Family reunited for a Celebration Tour in November 2011 through February 2012, as well as a new album, Together Again, released February 7, 2012.

The Crabb Family reunited for a sold out tour in early 2015, as they celebrated 20 years in Christian music.

Kelly Bowling appeared as Nurse Kathy in the 2014 film Virtuous.

Re-union album
On February 28, 2020, the family released their first album in eight years, entitled 20/20.

Discography

Albums

Compilations
1998: The Best of the Crabb Family
2001: A Crabb Collection (Daywind)
2005: Super Southern Gospel (Daywind)
2005: The Hits... Live (Daywind)
2015: 20 Years: Platinum Edition (Daywind)

Radio Singles
The Crabb Family holds the record of having the second most No.1 songs on the Singing News Top 80 Radio Airplay Charts (The McKameys have the most.) They had fifteen: "Please Forgive Me", "Trail of Tears", "The Lamb, the Lion, and the King", "I Sure Miss You", "Through the Fire", "That's No Mountain", "The Reason That I'm Standing", "Don't You Wanna Go?", "Please Come Down to Me", "The Walk", "The Cross", "Jesus Will Do What You Can't", "He Came Looking for Me",  "Good Day",  and "The Shepherd's Call." The group has also ranked No. 1 on the Singing News yearly Top 40 Charts of the most played songs. Songs that hit that position are: "Please Forgive Me", "Through the Fire", and "The Reason That I'm Standing."

Awards and honors
The band has been presented the "Favorite Band of the Year" award by the Singing News readers in 1999, 2001, and 2003. The group has also won numerous SGN Music Awards (presented by SoGospelNews.com) including Song of the Year, Mixed Group of the Year and Album of the Year over the years.

Jason Crabb was the recipient of the "Favorite Young Artist" award at the 2000 Singing News Fan Awards and "Male Vocalist of the Year" at the 2004 Harmony Honors and SGN Music Awards. Meanwhile, sister Kelly Bowling garnered a "Female Vocalist of the Year" in the 2005 SGN Music Awards.  Justin Ellis, the group's pianist, was awarded Musician of the Year in the 2007 SGN Music Awards.

The Crabb Family has been nominated for 22 GMA Dove Awards, winning 11. They have also received three NARAS Grammy Award nominations.

Video
2003: #1 Hits Live (Eagle Vision)
2004: Crabb Fest Live 2003 (Word)
2005: Live at Brooklyn Tabernacle (Daywind)
2005: Remembering The Greats (Daywind)
2009: The Best of the Crabb Family (Spring House)
2009: Grand Finale: The Ultimate Concert Experience (Provident Music)

Gaither Homecoming video performances
2001: What a Time: "Please Forgive Me"
2001: Glorious Church: "That's No Mountain" (released in 2021)
2002: New Orleans Homecoming: "Through The Fire"
2002: God Bless America: "The Lion, The Lamb, And The King"
2003: Red Rocks Homecoming: "The Reason That I'm Standing"
2003: Dottie Rambo with the Homecoming Friends: "Tears Will Never Stain The Streets Of That City"
2003: Build A Bridge: "Greater Is He In Me"
2007: How Great Thou Art'': "I'd Rather Have Jesus"

External links

References

American gospel musical groups
Musical groups from Kentucky
Family musical groups
People from Beaver Dam, Kentucky
Southern gospel performers
Musical groups established in 1996
Musical groups disestablished in 2007
Musical groups reestablished in 2011